Džepnica is a village in the municipality of Blace, Serbia. According to the 2011 census, the village has a population of 194 people.

References

Populated places in Toplica District